Leonard Fenton (né Finestein; 29 April 1926 – 29 January 2022) was a British actor, director and painter, best known for his role as Dr. Harold Legg in EastEnders.

Early life
Fenton was born Leonard Finestein in Stepney, the son of Fanny (Goldberg) and Morris Feinstein, a women's garment maker. His parents were Ashkenazi Jews with ancestral roots in Eastern Europe (Riga in Latvia and Lithuania). He attended Raine Foundation Grammar School from 1937 to 1944. Fenton originally trained to be a civil engineer at King's College London and during World War II he was conscripted as an army engineer. He worked in this profession for five years after leaving the army, but eventually decided on a career change. He took up acting and won a scholarship to attend the Webber Douglas Academy of Dramatic Art in London.

Career
His career in acting spanned over sixty years. One of his earliest acting breaks came when he was offered a role by Orson Welles in his play Chimes at Midnight. Subsequent acting credits include: Studio Four (1962); Colditz (1974); Secret Army (1977); Z-Cars (1978); Play for Today (1981); Auf Wiedersehen, Pet (1983), and Shine on Harvey Moon (1982), where he played the Austrian Jew, Erich Gottlieb. In the theatre, Fenton played the role of Willie to Billie Whitelaw’s Winnie in Samuel Beckett’s Happy Days at the Royal Court Theatre in 1979, directed by Beckett himself.

Fenton was best known for playing Dr. Harold Legg, one of the original characters in the BBC soap opera, EastEnders. The character appeared from the show's inception in 1985 until 1997, returning for brief stints in 2000, 2004, 2007 and 2018 until 2019. The character was originally one of the main focal points of the programme, but after 1989 he became less central. After the character's retirement in 1997, Fenton's appearances in EastEnders were infrequent. He made a single appearance in 2004 at the funeral of Mark Fowler, and in June 2007 to counsel Dot Branning regarding her concerns about Romanian 'foundling' baby, Tomas.

Fenton's subsequent television credits included Rumpole of the Bailey; So You Think You've Got Troubles (1991); Love Hurts (1993) and The Bill (1985; 2001; 2005), among others. In the West End, he performed in two productions by Lindsay Anderson, Anton Chekhov's The Seagull and Ben Travers' last play, The Bed Before Yesterday. He performed in many radio plays, including The Hobbit as the Elvenking, and The Lord of the Rings as Daddy Twofoot, both for BBC Radio 4. Amongst Fenton's other broadcasting work was the BBC webcast of the Doctor Who story Death Comes to Time. On 17 February 2006, he made a personal appearance on the Channel 4 entertainment show, The Friday Night Project. His film credits included roles in Up the Creek (1958), The Devil-Ship Pirates (1964), Robin Hood Junior (1975), Give My Regards to Broad Street (1984), Morons from Outer Space (1985), and the British horror movie The Zombie Diaries (2006).

In December 2004, at the age of 78, Fenton made his directorial debut with After Chekhov, written by four contemporary writers Allen Drury, Martin Jago, Andrew Neil and Olwen Wymark in the 100th anniversary year of Chekhov's death. The piece, produced by Little London Theatre Company was performed in the Soho Theatre Studio. In 2012 and again in 2013, Fenton appeared in a production of Cross Purpose, directed by Stephen Whitson at the King's Head Theatre, London.

On 25 July 2018, it was confirmed that Fenton would reprise his role as Dr. Harold Legg in EastEnders in late 2018. This stint lasted until 15 February 2019, when the character died after a long battle with pancreatic cancer.

Personal life and death
Fenton and cellist Madeline Thorner married in 1967. They had four children and later separated. Aside from acting, he was also a professional painter and held several exhibitions. Before the 2010 general election, Fenton came out in support of the Labour Party, after appearing in their election broadcast.

He died on 29 January 2022, at the age of 95. His former co-star June Brown memorialised him as "A charming man in all ways, first as a person and then as an actor, extremely polite and kind".

Partial filmography
 Up the Creek (1958) as Policeman
 Breakout (1959) as Prison Officer (uncredited)
 Third Man on the Mountain (1959) (uncredited)
 The Devil-Ship Pirates (1964) as Pirate
 The Virtuoso (TV Movie - 1975) as Hazard
 Robin Hood Junior (1975) as Messenger
 Give My Regards to Broad Street (1984) as Company Accountant
 EastEnders (1985–1997, 2000, 2004, 2007, 2018–2019) as Dr. Harold Legg (274 episodes)
 Morons from Outer Space (1985) as Commissionaire
 The Bill (2001) (Series 17 episode 70) as Archie Dodds
 The Zombie Diaries (2006) as Bill
 Underground (2007) as Terry Page

References

External links
 
 Dr. Legg BBC character profile
 

1926 births
2022 deaths
20th-century English male actors
20th-century English painters
21st-century English male actors
Alumni of King's College London
Alumni of the Webber Douglas Academy of Dramatic Art
British Army personnel of World War II
English Jews
English directors
English male painters
English male radio actors
English male soap opera actors
English people of Latvian-Jewish descent
English people of Lithuanian-Jewish descent
People educated at Raine's Foundation School
People from the London Borough of Tower Hamlets
Royal Engineers soldiers
20th-century English male artists